Dravograd Sports Centre is a multi-purpose stadium in Dravograd, Slovenia. It is currently used mostly for football matches and is the home ground of the Slovenian Third League team NK Dravograd. The stadium was the main venue for the Slovenia women's national football team in the UEFA Women's Euro 2009 qualifiers.

The stadium was built in 1995 and was renovated in 1999. It currently holds 2,118 spectators, 1,918 of them can be seated.

See also
List of football stadiums in Slovenia

References

External links
Soccerway profile
Stadioni.org profile

Football venues in Slovenia
Multi-purpose stadiums in Slovenia
Sports venues completed in 1995
1995 establishments in Slovenia